is a Japanese professional shogi player ranked 9-dan.

Shogi professional
On February 7, 2013, Senzaki defeated Eiji Iijima in  an Mejin Class B2 game to become the 47th professional to win 600 official games.

Promotion history
The promotion history for Senzaki is as follows:
 5-kyū: 1981
 1-dan: 1985
 4-dan: October 19, 1987
 5-dan: October 8, 1990
 6-dan: June 8, 1994
 7-dan: April 1, 1999
 8-dan: April 1, 2000
 9-dan: April 1, 2014

Titles and other championships

References

External links

ShogiHub: Professional Player Info · Senzaki, Manabu

1970 births
Japanese shogi players
Living people
Professional shogi players
Professional shogi players from Aomori Prefecture